Borys Rafailovych Kaufman (Ukrainian: Борис Рафаїлович Кауфман; born in 25 November 1973), is a Ukrainian businessperson, shareholder at Vertex United.

Odessa Airport Ltd. 
In 2011, ownership of 75% of  Odesa International Airport was transferred to Odesa Airport Development Limited, controlled by Borys Kaufman and Oleksandr Hranovskyi. The businessmen are reconstructing the airport.

References

1973 births
Businesspeople from Odesa
Living people